Carlos Andrés Ramirez Aguirre (born May 1, 1988) is a Colombian football defender. He currently plays for Millonarios.

References 

1988 births
Living people
Colombian footballers
Deportivo Pereira footballers
Millonarios F.C. players
Once Caldas footballers
Envigado F.C. players
Association football defenders
People from Pereira, Colombia